Raymond Omonical Tyshone Walls (born July 24, 1979 in Kentwood, Louisiana) is a former American football cornerback in the NFL. He was drafted in the fifth round of the 2001 NFL Draft. In his career, he played for the Indianapolis Colts, Cleveland Browns, Baltimore Ravens, and Arizona Cardinals.

References

1979 births
Living people
People from Kentwood, Louisiana
American football cornerbacks
Southern Miss Golden Eagles football players
Indianapolis Colts players
Cleveland Browns players
Baltimore Ravens players
Arizona Cardinals players